Dame Maura Patricia McGowan DBE (born 27 January 1957), styled The Hon. Mrs Justice McGowan, is a judge of the High Court of England and Wales.

Personal life and education 
She was educated at Virgo Fidelis Convent School and the University of Manchester.

McGowan is a Trustee of the London Irish Centre.

Career 
She was called to the bar at Middle Temple in 1980 and began work at '2 Bedford Row' and 'Lincoln House chambes', specialising in Criminal law.

She was appointed King's Counsel (previously Queen's) in 2001.

McGowan was appointed as a Recorder in 2000 and assigned to the South Eastern circuit. She would later be appointed as a High Court judge in 2014 and be assigned to the King's Bench Division. She received the customary Dame Commander in November 2014.

McGowan was elected a Bencher of Middle Temple in 2005 and later, a Treasurer for 2022.

Notable cases 
Murder of Rikki Neave
John Worboys
2018 Westminster car attack

References

1957 births
Living people
Alumni of the University of Manchester
Members of the Middle Temple
Queen's Bench Division judges
English women judges
Place of birth missing (living people)
Dames Commander of the Order of the British Empire